Milagros, officially the Municipality of Milagros,  is a 1st class municipality in the province of Masbate, Philippines. According to the 2020 census, it has a population of 57,538 people.

It is facing the Asid Gulf and is the largest municipality in the province in terms of land area.

Etymology

Milagros got its name from Spanish word Milagro meaning miracle. Stories handed down from generation to generation told us that the community was founded by early settlers who are peace loving and faithful converted Christians. Early then, coastal communities are the center of trade and commerce because of its facility to transport goods and products to and from the other communities. These are often the targets of marauding “moro” bandits who pillage and wreak havoc to victim communities. News of the atrocities caused by these heartless invaders sent shivers to the bones of those unwarring communities.

One day a flotilla of vintas with armed men aboard anchored at the bay ready to attack on signal. People scampered to safety to neighboring hills leaving behind the weak, the sick and the old. Being true believers of the Christian faith, they implored the aid of their patron Saint, St. Joseph to spare them from the wrath of these heartless invaders. Their prayers were not left unanswered. Every time these invaders are poised to attack, they saw myriads of armed combatants with guns and cannons lined up at the shore in defense position, thus giving the bandits second thoughts of pursuing their attack. Every time these bandits are set to attack these armed combatants always appear. Sensing that they are vulnerable to these invincible defenders, the “moro” bandits called off the attack.

This always happened whenever there were invaders who threaten the peaceful community. News of these events circulated among other bandit groups, which eventually deter them from raiding the community.

For these countless miracles, the community was called “MILAGROS”.

History
Milagros is one of the original municipalities of Masbate since its creation as a New Province by virtue of Philippine Commission Act. No. 105 enacted on March 18, 1901. It is the mother municipality of Cawayan, Balud and Mandaon until their creation under Executive Order 244.

The former dominant political clan in Milagros was the De Jesus Clan and followed by the Abapo Clan. In 2015, former Milagros town Mayor Bernardito Abapo was arrested in a raid by the Philippine National Police and Philippine Drug Enforcement Agency on a suspected drug laboratory in Masbate province. The results of the 2007 Local Elections replaced the Abapo Clan by the Magbalon Clan Dr. Natividad Isabel Revil-Magbalon finished her 3-consecutive terms or a total of 9 years as being the mayor of the municipality. Since Dr. Natividad Isabel Magbalon can no longer run for mayor, her husband Jose Magbalon Jr. run on her behalf and won the 2016 elections with 51.2% votes over his opponent Bobet Trias.

Geography

The municipality is endowed with rich mineral resources the as of to date has partially been tapped. Manganese is being extracted at barangays Pamangpangon and Taisan and as being exported to Japan. Large deposit of white clay, which maybe used in making of porcelain products and other novelty items can be found at Barangay Bonbon and Matanglad. Other precious minerals such as gold, copper and silver are also present in the area.

The municipality is bounded on the south by Asia Gulf which is part of the Visayan Sea, a rich existing fishing ground.

Aware of the need to conserve, protect and manage our marine resources, the LGU has passed the Municipal Fishery Ordinance and Instituted the Coastal Resource Management Program.

Under this program, Bangad Fish Sanctuary was established and Mangrove Reforestation was launched and sustained. Fish wardens are trained and deputized. Other coastal barangays has resorted to seaweeds farming as alternative livelihood and to prevent corals and sea grass from further degradation from drag net and trawl fishing.

Barangays
Milagros is located at the southern part of the Masbate Island duplicating boomerang shape of the Island. It is bounded out the north by the Mobo, Baleno, Masbate City, Mobo, North – East by Uson North West by Aroroy, Mandaon and Balud,  On the East by the Municipality of Cawayan and to the south by Asid Gulf.

It is the largest municipality of the province with an area of 56, 540 hectares. It is composed of 27 barangay with one island barangay and one island sitio. It has an estimated population of 50, 100 for the year 2007.

Climate

Demographics

Economy

References

External links

 [ Philippine Standard Geographic Code]
Philippine Census Information
Local Governance Performance Management System

Municipalities of Masbate